The England Classic tournament is a darts tournament that has been held since 2009.

List of winners

Men's

Women's

Tournament records
 Most wins 3:  Glen Durrant. 
 Most Finals 3:  Glen Durrant.
 Most Semi Finals 3:  Glen Durrant,  Paul Hogan.
 Most Quarter Finals 3:  Glen Durrant,  Paul Hogan,  Stephen Bunting,  Wesley Harms.
 Most Appearances 6:  Martin Atkins.
 Most Prize Money won £6,500:  Glen Durrant.
 Best winning average (106.50) :  Glen Durrant. v's  Jim Williams, 2015,   Final.
 Youngest Winner age 25:   Stephen Bunting. 
 Oldest Winner age 48:  Glen Durrant.

References

External links

2009 establishments in England
British Darts Organisation tournaments
Darts tournaments